Donax is a genus of plants. It contains only one recognized species: Donax canniformis (G.Forst.) K.Schum, widespread from the Andaman Islands, Myanmar (Burma), southern China, Southeast Asia, New Guinea, Melanesia and Micronesia.

References

Marantaceae
Flora of China
Flora of Taiwan
Flora of Indo-China
Flora of Malesia
Flora of Papuasia
Flora of Vanuatu